Frederick Walker  (London, 26 May 1840 – 4 June 1875 St Fillans) was a British social realist painter and illustrator. He was described by Sir John Everett Millais as "the greatest artist of the century".

Life and work

Early life and training
Walker was born at 90 Great Titchfield Street, Marylebone in London as one of eight children: the elder of twins and fifth son of William Henry, jeweller, and Ann (née Powell) Walker. His grandfather, William Walker, had been an artist, who exhibited regularly at the Royal Academy and British Institution in 1782–1802. Fredrick's mother was an embroiderer and became the family's main breadwinner when his father died in 1847.

Walker received his education at a local school and later at the North London Collegiate School in Camden. He showed a talent for art from an early age, teaching himself to copy prints using pen and ink. He also practised drawing in the British Museum. In 1855–1857, he worked in an architect's office in Gower Street, but he gave this up to become a student at the British Museum and at James Mathews Leigh's art school.

In March 1858 he was admitted as a student to the Royal Academy, and later that year became also a part-time apprentice wood-engraver to Josiah Wood Whymper in Lambeth, soon abandoning his Academy classes. During the two years of his apprenticeship he met fellow artists J. W. North and George Pinwell, and he continued to paint in his spare time, in oils and watercolours.

As illustrator

In 1859 Walker joined the Artists' Society in Langham Chambers, and from 1860 to 1865 achieved great success as a black-and-white illustrator for popular journals of the day such as Cornhill Magazine, Once a Week, Good Words, Everybody's Journal, and Leisure Hour. Much of his work in this period was engraved by Joseph Swain. He was introduced to the satirist and author William Thackeray, the Cornhill'''s editor, for whom he provided drawings, such as "Comfort in grief", for "The Adventures of Philip", initially published as a serial, then as a book in 1862. He also illustrated Thackeray's unfinished novel "Denis Duval", magazine stories by Thackeray's daughter Ann Ritchie – many of the drawings later reproduced in watercolour – and provided drawings such as "Summer days" for the Dalziel brothers, which appeared in two poetry books: "A Round of Days" and "Wayside Posies".

As artist
Walker produced his first important watercolour, "Strange faces" in 1862 at Yale Center for British Art, New Haven, and in the following year "Philip in Church", which won a medal at the Paris Exhibition of 1867. Walker exhibited at the Royal Watercolour Society from 1864 until the end of his life, becoming an associate member in February 1864 and a full member in 1866, entitling him to add the post-nominal initials RWS to his name.  In 1871 he was elected an Associate Royal Academician (ARA), and was elected an honorary member of the Belgian Watercolour Society in the same year.

In 1863 Walker exhibited his first oil painting, The Lost Path at the Royal Academy of Arts. Thereafter he showed "Wayfarers" (1866, private collection), "Bathers" (1867, Lady Lever Art Gallery), "Vagrants" (1868, Tate, London), "The Old Gate" (1869, Tate, London), The Plough (1870; Tate Britain, London), At the Bar (1871; Untraced), The Harbour of Refuge (1872, Tate, London) and The Right of Way (1875; National Gallery of Victoria, Melbourne).

Final years

Walker never married, spending his life in London with family members: his brother John (died 1868), his sister Fanny (died 1876) and his mother (died 1874). They resided in Bayswater from 1863. He twice visited Paris in 1863 and 1867, and Venice in 1868 and 1870, in the latter case with a friend, William Quiller Orchardson. In 1873 he travelled to Algiers in a failed attempt to recuperate from a bout of tuberculosis that worsened until his death in June 1875 at St Fillans in Perthshire, Scotland. He was buried at Cookham.

Books partly illustrated by Walker
W. M. Thackeray, The Adventures of Philip (London: Smith, Elder & Co., 1862)
George Dalziel, A Round of days (London: Routledge, 1866)
R. W. Buchanan, Wayside Posies (London: Routledge, 1867)
W. M. Thackeray,Denis Duval (London: Smith, Elder & Co., 1867)

Notes

Further reading

J. Comyns Carr, Essays on Art (London: Smith, Elder, & Co, 1879), pp. 198–222
John George Marks, Life and letters of Frederick Walker, A.R.A. (London: Macmillan & Co, 1896)
Claude Phillips, Frederick Walker and his works (London: Seeley & Co, 1897)
Clementina Black, Frederick Walker (London: Duckworth & Co, 1902)
Redgrave, Gilbert Richard. A history of water-colour painting in England (London: Society for Promoting Christian Knowledge, 1905)
Donato Esposito, 'Frederick Walker (1840–1875)', in Frederick Walker and the Idyllists'' (London: Lund Humphries, 2017), pp. 35–59

References

External links

 
 
Fred Walker ARA (Biog at southwilts.com)
Frederic Walker (Art Renewal Center Museum)
Frederic Walker (Victorian web)
Frederic Walker online (artcyclopedia.com)
Walker at the Tate Gallery
Autumn (1865 watercolour at the V & A)
Spring (1865 watercolour at the V & A)
 Profile on Royal Academy of Arts Collections

References

1840 births
1875 deaths
19th-century British painters
British male painters
British illustrators
British watercolourists
Social realist artists
Artists' Rifles soldiers
Associates of the Royal Academy
19th-century British male artists